The Communauté d'agglomération du Pays de Meaux (CAPM) is a communauté d'agglomération in the Seine-et-Marne département and in the Île-de-France région of France. The 4 communes of the former Communauté de communes des Monts de la Goële were merged into it on 1 January 2017. On 31 December 2019 it was expanded with 4 communes from the former communauté de communes du Pays Créçois. Its area is 214.4 km2. Its population was 106,448 in 2018, of which 55,416 in Meaux.

Composition
The communauté d'agglomération consists of the following 26 communes:

Barcy
Boutigny
Chambry
Chauconin-Neufmontiers
Crégy-lès-Meaux
Forfry
Fublaines
Germigny-l'Évêque
Gesvres-le-Chapitre
Isles-lès-Villenoy
Mareuil-lès-Meaux
Meaux
Montceaux-lès-Meaux
Monthyon
Nanteuil-lès-Meaux
Penchard
Poincy
Quincy-Voisins
Saint-Fiacre
Saint-Soupplets
Trilbardou
Trilport
Varreddes
Vignely
Villemareuil
Villenoy

See also
Communes of the Seine-et-Marne department

References

Meaux
Meaux